Romualdez is a surname. Notable people with the surname include:

Alberto Romualdez (1940–2013), Filipino politician and doctor
Martin Romualdez (born 1963), Filipino politician, Media businessman person
Benjamin Romualdez (1930–2012), Filipino politician, former Governor of Leyte, ambassador to the United States, China and Saudi Arabia
Jose Manuel Romualdez (born 1947), Filipino Diplomat
Daisy Romualdez, Filipino actress, married to well known former basketball player Manny Paner
Daniel Romualdez (1907–1965), Filipino politician, Speaker of the House of Representatives of the Philippines (1957–1962)
Ferdinand Romualdez Marcos Jr. (born 1957), 17th President of the Philippines and former senator, only son of former Philippine President Ferdinand E. Marcos
Imee Romualdez Marcos (born 1955), Filipino politician, Governor of Ilocos Norte and senator, daughter of Ferdinand E. Marcos
Imelda Romualdez Marcos (born 1929), Filipino politician, widow of former Philippine President Ferdinand Marcos
Norberto Romuáldez (1875–1941), Philippine writer, politician, jurist and statesman
Johnny Romualdez (born 1941), former Philippine international footballer and former President of the Philippine Football Federation (PFF)
Jose Manuel Romualdez (born 1947), Filipino journalist, Ambassador to the United States
Remedios T. Romualdez (1902–1938), the mother of Imelda Marcos, widow of former Philippine President Ferdinand Marcos

See also
Daniel Z. Romualdez Airport (IATA: TAC, ICAO: RPVA), an airport serving the general area of Tacloban City in the province of Leyte in the Philippines
Remedios T. Romualdez, Agusan del Norte, 5th class municipality in the province of Agusan del Norte, Philippines